Bernardino Corniani (1626–1689) was a Roman Catholic prelate who served as Bishop of Pula (1664–1689).

Biography
Bernardino Corniani was born in Venice, Italy.
On 11 Feb 1664, he was appointed by Pope Alexander VII as Bishop of Pula. 
He served as Bishop of Pula until his death on 28 Jan 1689.

While bishop, he was the principal consecrator of Aleksandar Ignacije Mikulić Brokunovečki, Bishop of Knin (1688); and the principal co-consecrator of Nikola Spanic, Bishop of Korčula.

References

External links and additional sources
 (for Chronology of Bishops) 
 (for Chronology of Bishops) 

17th-century Roman Catholic bishops in Croatia
1626 births
1689 deaths
Republic of Venice clergy
Bishops appointed by Pope Alexander VII